Saikaku is a crater on Mercury.  Its name was adopted by the International Astronomical Union (IAU) in 1979. The crater is named for Japanese poet Ihara Saikaku.

References

Impact craters on Mercury